Canoe Lake is a lake in South Frontenac, Frontenac County, Ontario, Canada, just south of the community of Fermoy.

See also
List of lakes in Ontario

References

Lakes of Frontenac County